Christopher Michael Ross (born March 9, 1985) is a Filipino-American professional basketball player for the San Miguel Beermen of the Philippine Basketball Association (PBA).

Ross played high school basketball at John Jay High School in San Antonio, Texas, where as a junior, he sank a 50-foot half-court buzzer-beater to give Jay the 2002 Class 5A state basketball championship. After high school he played college basketball at McLennan Community College and Marshall University.

Ross can play both guard positions and is currently the starting point guard for the Beermen. In his tenure with the Beermen, he is known for his defensive skills, thus recognized as one of the best defenders in the league.

Professional career
Chris Ross was drafted by the Air21 Express back in 2009 as the third pick of the first-round.

Meralco Bolts
On June 6, 2012, with the Bolts, Ross recorded 18 points, 7 rebounds and 5 assists in an 83–88 loss to B-Meg Llamados. On July 8, 2012, Ross recorded 15 points and 5 assists in 31 minutes of playing time as a reserve in a losing effort to the Rain or Shine Elasto Painters. On July 15, 2012, Ross almost recorded a triple-double of 10 points, 10 rebounds and 8 assists in a win against his future the San Miguel Beermen.

On November 28, 2012, Ross recorded a double-double of 14 points and 10 assists in 34 minutes of playing time in an 85–88 loss to the Alaska Aces.

On February 16, 2013, against Rain or Shine, Ross almost recorded a triple-double after having racked up 6 points, 9 rebounds, 9 assists and 2 steals but in a losing effort. Eight days later, Ross recorded only 2 points but also his career-high in assists with 17 assists in a 90–89 win over the GlobalPort Batang Pier.

On March 15, 2013, with the Bolts, Ross recorded his first career triple-double having the statline of 10 points, 10 rebounds and 10 assists but in a losing effort to the San Mig Coffee Mixers, 71–76.

San Miguel Beermen

2013–14 Season
On October 30, 2013, Chris Ross was traded to the San Miguel Beermen in exchange for Denok Miranda.

On November 20, 2013, Ross debuts for the Beermen. He recorded only 3 points but has 5 rebounds, 6 assists and 3 steals in a win over the GlobalPort Batang Pier. In his third game with Beermen, Ross recorded 10 points, 5 rebounds and 6 assists in 26 minutes of playing time that resulted in a 90–88 win over the Air21 Express. The next game, Ross recorded 8 points, 4 rebounds, 6 assists and 4 steals for the Beermen as they won the game, 77–73, against his former team the Meralco Bolts. On January 18, 2014, in the last game of the 2013–14 Philippine Cup elimination, Ross contributed a conference-high 18 points to go along with 2 rebounds and a steal in a 96–87 win over the Meralco Bolts.

During the 2014 Philippine Cup Playoffs, Ross averaged 9 points, 2.5 rebounds per game, 3.5 assists per game in 17.5 minutes of playing time in a 2-game quarterfinals sweep against the Barako Bull Energy. However, they bowed down to the Rain Or Shine Elasto Painters in five games during the semifinals round. Ross recorded 8 points and 4 assists in their lone win in the series against the Elasto Painters.

In the first 3 games of the 2014 Commissioners' Cup, Ross averaged 4.3 points per game, 2.7 rebounds per game, 5.3 assists per game and 2.3 steals per game. However, the Beermen, in those 3 games has a record of 2–1. Their lone loss in that span came on March 14, 2014, against the TNT Katropa. On March 19, in a rematch against the Rain or Shine Elasto Painters, whom they lost in 5 games during the 2014 Philippine Cup playoffs, Ross recorded a season-high 22 points, 5 rebounds, 10 assists and 5 steals in 112–107 win for the Beermen. On May 25, Ross recorded a double-double of 12 points and 11 assists in a 109–92 win over the Northport Batang Pier.

2014–15 Season
Ross recorded his first double-digit scoring output of the season after scoring 12 points to go along with 3 steals in a 79–76 win over the NLEX Road Warriors back on November 8, 2014. In Game 2 of the 2015 Philippine Cup Finals, Ross recorded his first double-digit scoring output in the finals after scoring 12 points and dished out 5 assists in a 100–86 win over the Alaska Aces.

PBA career statistics

As of the end of 2021 season

Season-by-season

|-
| align=left rowspan=2| 
| align=left | Coca-Cola
| rowspan=2|37 || rowspan=2|16.9 || rowspan=2|.381 || rowspan=2|.095 || rowspan=2|.467 || rowspan=2|2.4 || rowspan=2|2.6 || rowspan=2|1.0 || rowspan=2|.2 || rowspan=2|4.5
|-
| align=left | Sta. Lucia
|-
| align=left | 
| align=left | Meralco
| 25 || 32.5 || .376 || .000 || .526 || 5.4 || 6.2 || 2.0 || .3 || 8.0
|-
| align=left | 
| align=left | Meralco
| 29 || 29.3 || .333 || .180 || .600 || 4.1 || 6.1 || 1.6 || .3 || 6.5
|-
| align=left | 
| align=left | Meralco
| 42 || 28.6 || .312 || .145 || .610 || 4.2 || 6.6 || 1.7 || .2 || 5.2
|-
| align=left | 
| align=left | Petron / San Miguel
| 35 || 24.1 || .381 || .182 || .714 || 3.4 || 5.1 || 1.9 || - || 7.8
|-
| align=left | 
| align=left | San Miguel
| 54 || 20.1 || .435 || .245 || .679 || 2.9 || 2.7 || 1.4 || .2 || 5.4
|-
| align=left | 
| align=left | San Miguel
| 57 || 26.1 || .381 || .206 || .728 || 3.6 || 4.8 || 2.0 || .3 || 6.5
|-
| align=left | 
| align=left | San Miguel
| 58 || 35.7 || .421 || .318 || .696 || 5.0 || 7.2 || 2.8 || .4 || 11.2
|-
| align=left | 
| align=left | San Miguel
| 57 || 31.6 || .375 || .306 || .754 || 4.6 || 5.4 || 1.8 || .1 || 8.3
|-
| align=left | 
| align=left | San Miguel
| 60 || 35.5 || .392 || .359 || .707 || 5.0 || 5.4 || 2.2 || .4  || 8.8
|-
| align=left | 
| align=left | San Miguel
| 13 || 30.5 || .286 || .256 || .726 || 5.4 || 4.2 || 2.2 || .3 || 7.4
|-
| align=left | 
| align=left | San Miguel
| 27 || 32.5 || .355 || .208 || .744 || 4.6 || 5.1 || 2.0 || .3 || 5.8
|-class=sortbottom
| colspan=2 align=center | Career
| 494 || 28.7 || .379 || .273 || .669 || 4.1 || 5.1 || 1.9 || .2 || 7.3

Awards & Milestones
 January 21, 2015: Ross won his first PBA Championship after the San Miguel Beermen defeated the Alaska Aces in 7 games in the Philippine Cup Finals. 
 February 3, 2016 — Ross was named Finals MVP after scoring a career high of 21 points with five rebounds, five assists, and shooting 4 for 6 from the 3-point line in game 7 of the 2016 Philippine Cup Finals.
 October 14, 2016 — Ross was recognized during the PBA Leo Awards Night and named to the PBA All-Defensive Team.
 February 10, 2017: Chris Ross became the 27th player in PBA history to reach 500 career steals.
 March 5, 2017: Chris Ross led the San Miguel Beermen towards a championship against their arch-rivals, the Barangay Ginebra San Miguel. They defeated them in five games. With the effort he does, Ross became the 2017 Philippine Cup PBA Finals MVP.

References

External links
 Player Profile at PBA-Online!
 Marshall University Profile
 Ross still living the dream

1985 births
Living people
American sportspeople of Filipino descent
Basketball players from San Antonio
Filipino men's basketball players
Citizens of the Philippines through descent
Junior college men's basketball players in the United States
Marshall Thundering Herd men's basketball players
McLennan Highlanders athletes
Meralco Bolts players
Panola College alumni
Philippine Basketball Association All-Stars
Point guards
Powerade Tigers players
San Miguel Beermen players
Shooting guards
Sta. Lucia Realtors players
American men's basketball players
Southeast Asian Games gold medalists for the Philippines
Southeast Asian Games medalists in basketball
Philippines men's national basketball team players
Competitors at the 2019 Southeast Asian Games
Barako Bull Energy draft picks